Szabotage is a British urban artist and interior designer. He was born as Gustav Szabo in Brighton, grew up in Hove and London, studied architecture and worked as a designer. He relocated to Hong Kong, where he became active in the street art scene and began to gain notoriety in the local and international urban art world.

Career
Szabotage has painted for the HKwalls street art festival and was a finalist in the global phenomenon 'Secret Walls,' where he used old-school graffiti style and onstage antics. These antics debuted on the TEDx stage in 2017 with his talk ‘Resilience is the Ultimate High’.

His work is characterised by bright colours mixed with popular cultural references.  His vision takes a critical view of its immediate surroundings and often references the landscape of world cities, exploring the relationship between urban architecture and their communities. He is working with a variety of techniques and mediums, with his body of work ranging from canvas portraits, prints, interiors, cars, sculptures, stencils and products.  The artist constantly challenges typical canvas limitations, through upcycling and recycling, creating sculptures using deconstructed aerosol cans, metals and wood.  The artist is best recognised by his signature Koi fish - an iconic symbol of strength, adversity and good fortune – which features frequently throughout his work.

Szabotage held his first London solo exhibition ‘SHHH Women's Erotic Emporium’, in Shoreditch, London.  Since then, he has exhibited internationally, with sold out exhibitions, solo shows, and numerous collaborative projects, commercial and private commissions, including Louis Vuitton, Prada, Evisu, Ritz Carlton, Jaeger Lecoultre, Gweilo Beer, and Pret A Manger.

Szabotage is the first urban artist in Hong Kong to offer NFTs, dropping November 2020 on OpenSea. He started getting involved with NFTs back in September 2020, after collector Benjamin Rameau started talking about them and offered to help create and set up Szabotage NFTs.

Exhibitions 

2021 Digital Art Fair Asia // Hong Kong
2021 Solo Show // Life Got Real, SHOUT Gallery Hong Kong
2021 Affordable Art Fair Hong Kong, Presented by Art Supermarket Gallery
2021 Group Exhibition DRIVEN // Hong Kong Arts Collective Zung Fu Affordable Art Fair, Hong Kong
2021 Online Art Fair, Presented by Art Supermarket Gallery on Affordable Art Fair Hong Kong
2020 Group Exhibition Square Print // Hong Kong Arts Collective, Hong Kong
2020 Solo Exhibition // SPRAYCATION Art Supermarket, Hong Kong
2020 Group Exhibition // Hong Kong Arts Collective, Hong Kong
2019 Solo Exhibition // Brick House X HKArts Collective Presents Artist of the Month, Hong Kong
2019 K11, Musea Art, Crockerydile, Hong Kong
2019 Group Show, LGBT Arcus Pride Art, Clifford Chance, Red Chamber Gallery
2019 Affordable Art Fair, Art Supermarket, Hong Kong
2019 Solo Exhibition // SUBLIMEY, Art Supermarket, Hong Kong
2019 Solo Exhibition // Reflections, The Mira Hotel, TST, Hong Kong
2019 The Objet Nomades, By Louis Vuitton, Tai Kwun, Hong Kong
2019 Wallskar, Graffiti and Street Art Festival, Hong Kong Edition
2018 Affordable Art Fair, Art Supermarket, Hong Kong
2018 Duo Exhibition // Saskia Wesseling + Szabotage, Wong Chuk Hang, Hong Kong
2017 Solo Exhibition // FISH 'N' CHIPS, Art Supermarket, Hong Kong
2017 Asia Contemporary Art Show, Macey and Sons, Hong Kong
2017 Affordable Art Fair, Art Supermarket, Hong Kong
2017 Group Exhibition // Women In Focus, AWETHENTIC Gallery, Hong Kong
2017 TEDx Talk // “Resilience is the Ultimate High”, HKUST Hong Kong
2016 Solo Show + Exhibition // GONE FISHING! Loft 22, California Tower, LFK, Hong Kong
2016 Live Mural // Love Is Wild, Walls Of Change, Project C:Change, Hong Kong
2016 Group Exhibition // Minor Chords, Brickhouse, Hong Kong
2015 Street Art Festival // HK WALLS,, Hong Kong
2015 Installation // Floor of Love, Sav Hotel, Hong Kong
2015 Exhibition // Pang x Szabotage, Gallery 88, Sheung Wan, Hong Kong
2015 Exhibition + Live Artwork // Hong Kong Classic Car Show
2015 Show // Hong Kong Makes Sense, Hong Kong
2015 Group Exhibition // Illicit Leggit, Lott Five, Soho, Hong Kong
2015  Group Exhibition // Design Commune by ARRAKIS Oggetti & Colourliving, PMQ, Hong Kong
2015 Solo Exhibition // Szabotage by Together, Kwun Tong
2015 Solo Exhibition // M Space, by PRC Magazine and Peter Boyle, Sheung Wan, Hong Kong
2014 Finalist, Secret Walls, Hong Kong
2014 Creation of the “Koi”
2012 Solo Exhibition // Hackney Road Car Park, Shoreditch London
2010 Solo Show // SHHH Women's Erotic Emporium, Shoreditch, London

References 

British artists
British interior designers
Living people
Year of birth missing (living people)